U-89843A (PNU-89843) is a sedative drug which acts as an agonist at GABAA receptors, specifically acting as a positive allosteric modulator selective for the α1, α3 and α6 subtypes. It has sedative effects in animals but without causing ataxia, and also acts as an antioxidant and may have neuroprotective effects. It was developed by a team at Upjohn in the 1990s.

References 

Sedatives
Pyrrolidines
Pyrrolopyrimidines
GABAA receptor positive allosteric modulators